Wyrd is a concept in Anglo-Saxon culture roughly corresponding to fate or personal destiny.

Wyrd may also refer to:

Wyrd (band), a Finnish black metal band
Wyrd (company), a miniatures company
Wyrd (album), an album by the band Elvenking
 WYRD (AM), a radio station (1330 AM) licensed to Greenville, South Carolina, United States
 WYRD-FM, a radio station (106.3 FM) licensed to Simpsonville, South Carolina, United States
 Wyrd Con Interactive Theater convention, a LARPing con

See also

 
 Weird (disambiguation)